Mount Banck is a conspicuous mountain of red rock, 675 m, dominating the small peninsula just west of Mascias Cove, on the west coast of Graham Land. In 1898 the Belgian Antarctic Expedition under Gerlache applied the name "Ile Banck" to a feature which was charted as an island separated from the mainland by a narrow channel. Air photos show it is actually a small peninsula, on which the most prominent feature is this mountain. The name Mount William, given by Biscoe in 1832 to a mountain which he described as being on the mainland but now identified on Anvers Island, has been used for the feature here described.

Mountains of the Palmer Archipelago